Khebar is a town in Matiari District, Sindh, in Pakistan. The majority of the population is Meghwar Bhil and the Kolis who are all Ismaili Shia, and were previously Hindus.

References 

Geography of Sindh